The 2022 Philippine general election took place on May 9, 2022, for executive and legislative branches of the government – national, provincial, and local, except for the barangay officials.

At the top of the ballot is the election for successors to Philippine President Rodrigo Duterte and Vice President Leni Robredo. There were also elections for:

 12 seats to the Senate;
 All 316 seats to the House of Representatives;
 All 81 governors and vice governors, and 782 seats to provincial boards in all provinces;
 All 146 city mayors and vice mayors, and 1,650 seats to city councils in all cities
 All 1,488 municipal mayors and vice mayors, and 11,908 seats to municipal councils in all municipalities

The first election to the Bangsamoro Parliament was scheduled to be held on the same date, but was rescheduled to 2025.

This is the first election in Davao de Oro under such name, as it was renamed from "Compostela Valley" in December 2019 after a successful plebiscite.

Preparation

Commission on Elections membership 

In September 2020, President Rodrigo Duterte appointed lawyer Michael Peloton as commissioner, filling in for the seat vacated by Luie Tito Guia's retirement. As this was a regular appointment as opposed to an ad interim one made when Congress is in recess, Peloton has to be confirmed by the Commission on Appointments before he can take office. In November, Duterte appointed Davao del Norte election supervisor Aimee Ferolino Ampoloquio to the seat vacated by Al Parreño.

By October 2021, there were reports that Duterte will appoint the Melvin Matibag, the secretary-general of the PDP–Laban faction preferred by the former, as chairman. Matibag denied he knows about him in talks in being appointed as chairman. Several weeks later, Duterte appointed Rey Bulay, chief prosecutor of Manila, as commissioner, with a term ending in 2027, replacing Peloton, who was rejected by the Commission on Appointments. Bulay was accepted by the Commission on Appointments on December 1.

Chairman Sheriff Abas and commissioners Rowena Guanzon and Antonio Kho Jr. retired on February 2, 2022. Over a month later, acting presidential spokesperson Martin Andanar announced the appointments of Saidamen Balt Pangarungan as chairman, and George Erwin Garcia and Aimee Neri as commissioners. Garcia, who lists presidential candidate Bongbong Marcos as a previous client, promised to inhibit (i.e., recuse) himself from cases involving his former clients, including Marcos.

Voter registration 

Voter registration began on January 20, 2020, and was scheduled to end on September 30, 2021. The commission expects 4.3 million eligible voters to register. Registration was suspended in some areas in Cavite, Laguna and Batangas due to the Taal Volcano eruption, and in Makilala, Cotabato due to an earthquake. However, even before registration for 2022 opened, many other voters enrolled early between August 1 and September 30, 2019, ahead of the barangay and Sangguniang Kabataan elections initially scheduled for May 11, 2020, but were eventually postponed after the general election to December 5, 2022.

On March 10, the commission suspended voter registration in the entire country due to the COVID-19 pandemic in the Philippines. By June, the commission announced its initial resumption on July 1. However, the commission suspended voter registration anew up to August 31. The commission later stated on August 15 that voter registration would resume on September 1 in areas under general community quarantine (GCQ) or modified general community quarantine (MGCQ). Areas under enhanced community quarantine (ECQ) and modified enhanced community quarantine (MECQ) will have their registration suspended.

Registration in the province of Palawan was also suspended due to the plebiscite to divide it into three provinces on March 13, 2021. The plebiscite was originally set on May 11, 2020, but was rescheduled due to the pandemic.

In some areas, almost eight months of voter registration were lost due to lockdowns. There were calls to extend voter registration after September 30, 2021, but the commission rejected this, saying that this will delay other election-related activities. The commission instead allowed voter registration to continue in areas under modified enhanced community quarantine (MECQ) starting on September 6, with longer hours, and even in malls.

With barely a week before registration closed, the Senate passed a bill on second reading extending registration for another month. The House of Representatives likewise passed a similar bill days later, also on second reading. Earlier, both chambers separately passed resolutions urging the commission to extend registration, while the Senate threatened to cut the commission's 2022 budget if registration is not extended. On the eve of the end of registration, Sheriff Abas announced that they approved extending registration from October 11 to 30 for voters in the Philippines, and from October 1 to 14 for overseas voters. On the same day, President Duterte signed into law extending registration for 30 days from when it is made effective.

After extended registration ended, the commission announced that 400,000 people registered in October. The commission tallied 65,745,529 voters in the Philippines, with Calabarzon being the region with the most voters, with 9.1 million voters. The total was almost 4 million more as compared to 2019. By January 2022, the commission announced that they will print 67,442,714 ballots, with 1,697,202 of these for overseas absentee voting. The commission later released per-location total of registered voters, with Cebu (including independent cities associated with it) as the most vote-rich province, Quezon City the most vote-rich city, and Calabarzon being the most vote-rich region.

In connection to the 2021 Southeast Asian Games which will be held in Vietnam from May 12 to 23, 2022, the Philippine Sports Commission lobbied the commission to allow the participants to vote as local absentee voters. The commission denied the request, saying that unless a participant is a government official or employee, a member of either the Philippine National Police or Armed Forces of the Philippines who was assigned in places where one is not a voter, or media covering the games, the athlete cannot vote as a local absentee voter.

Election automation and logistics 
Representative from Camarines Sur Luis Raymund Villafuerte proposed to use a hybrid electoral system in 2022, or manual counting of votes, then electronic transmission of results. This is in contrast to the automated counting and transmission system used since 2010. He cited 40 lawsuits on the current system used by the Commission on Elections as evidence to shift away from automated counting of votes. President Rodrigo Duterte has suggested junking Smartmatic as the automation partner for future elections because of problems from the previous election. However, Smartmatic expressed its interest to participate in future elections. In May 2021, the commission awarded the contract to conduct automated elections, specifically the software that will be used in the voting machines, to Smartmatic.

Administration of logistics related to the election was awarded to F2 Logistics in August 2021. A former commissioner has questioned the deal because of the company's association with Dennis Uy, who donated to Duterte's 2016 presidential campaign. The commission stated that the deal with F2 Logistics is legal and valid.

Effects of the COVID-19 pandemic 

In April 2020, COMELEC Commissioner Rowena Guanzon has proposed voting by mail as an option in the elections, mainly due to the COVID-19 pandemic. By May 2021, Commissioner Antonio Kho Jr. said that voting hours will be extended, as the eight-hour timeframe given for previous elections cannot be used any longer. As for voting in multiple days, Kho said that only a law passed by Congress will allow that to happen.

Senator Juan Miguel Zubiri, in a privilege speech, disclosed that he commissioned a Pulse Asia survey in July 2021 which said that 46% of voters will not vote if COVID-19 cases in their barangay is high on election day, with 35% willing to vote and 19% undecided. Zubiri questioned if the public will accept the results if less than majority of the voters turned out to vote.

Postponement of the elections due to COVID-19 
The 1987 Constitution of the Philippines states that unless otherwise provided by law, the election of members of Congress is held on the second Monday of May. According to Republic Act No. 7166, the election for national, provincial, city and municipal positions are held on the second Monday of May, since 1992, and every three years thereafter, with the president and vice president being elected in six-year intervals. It has been three years since the 2019 general election and six years since the 2016 presidential election, and with no law postponing the election to date, this meant that the election is scheduled to be held on May 9, 2022.

However, some congressmen and government officials have suggested postponing the election due to the COVID-19 pandemic in the Philippines. Sherriff Abas, the chairman of the commission, said that it has not entered their minds, that the terms are fixed, adding that they are planning on having the vote done on two days. Postponement would only be possible if Congress passes a law permitting such, and if it is approved by the people in a plebiscite. The commission has no part in scheduling the election outside from what is mandated by the constitution.

A group called Coalition for Life and Democracy petitioned the commission to postpone the elections due to ongoing pandemic. The group conceded that only Congress can postpone the election, and that their petition contained different dates to hold the election: the body of the petition called for it to be rescheduled to May 2023. but the prayer in it called for it to be held in May 2025. Another petition that would affect the election's date was filed on December 31 by the Cusi wing of the PDP–Laban. Their petition aimed to re-open the filling of candidacies, and to suspend the printing of ballots. The commission tackled both petitions, and announced that both were unanimously dismissed on January 12.

Postponement of the Bangsamoro Parliament election 

In November 2020, the 80-person Bangsamoro Parliament passed a resolution urging Congress to extend the transition from June 2022 to 2025. If Congress agrees, no election shall be held. By July 2021, senator Juan Miguel Zubiri said that postponing the Bangsamoro election to 2025 is likely. In September, the Senate passed a bill postponing the election to 2025. A few days later, the House of Representatives passed their own version of the bill. As the two bills are different, it had to be reconciled before being sent to the President Duterte for his signature. Conference committee approved the Senate version, giving the winner of the 2022 presidential election the power of appointing the next transitional parliament. Duterte then signed the bill into law, postponing the election to 2025.

Electoral system 

In the Philippines, congressional and local elections, excluding regional and barangay levels, have been synchronized to be held on the second Monday of May every three years, starting in 1992. Presidents and vice presidents have six-year terms, so these are only elected on even-numbered years (1992, 1998, and so on). On election days where there the presidency is not on the ballot, these are called midterm elections, and occur on odd-numbered years (1995, 2001, and so on).

Every position has a separate ballot question, and is voted separately. Since 2010, general elections have been automated, and voters have to shade the oval of the candidate nearest to their choice. For executive positions, it is done via the first-past-the-post voting (FPTP) system, where the voter has one choice. For elections to the Senate and local legislatures, it is via multiple non-transferable vote, where the voter has x number of choices depending on the number of seats up for election (12 in the case of the Senate), and the x candidates with the highest number of votes win. For elections to the House of Representatives, the voter has two votes, one vote is via FPTP, and the other is done via a modified party-list proportional representation system.

Elections are organized, run, and adjudicated by the Commission on Elections (COMELEC), an independent governmental body, with appeals under certain conditions allowed to the Regional Trial Courts, the Congress of the Philippines, or the Supreme Court of the Philippines sitting as the House of Representatives Electoral Tribunal, the Senate Electoral Tribunal, or the Presidential Electoral Tribunal.

Calendar
This is the latest published calendar by COMELEC:

Timetable

Ballot printing was initially scheduled to start on January 15, 2022. However, technical issues hounded the printing, and the commission postponed it to January 17, and then to January 19. The commission started printing ballots on January 20, 2022.

Parties and coalitions 

As this is a presidential election year, presidential candidates may endorse a running mate for vice president, a senatorial slate, district and party-list representatives, and local officials, who may not be of the same party or coalition as him/her. Political parties in the Philippines have been described as "temporary political alliances", or argued that there are no parties at all, just "fan clubs of politicians". Party-switching is not uncommon. The dependence of parties on personalities instead of issues is seen as a factor on why this is so.

Parties and seats held prior to the elections 
The following table is sorted by which national party holds the presidency, vice presidency, number of House of Representatives (House) seats, then the number of Senate seats.

National conventions and assemblies 
National political conventions and assemblies were held to nominate candidates in the upcoming election. The PDP–Laban's two factions held separate conventions. On September 8, 2021, the Cusi faction held their national convention in San Fernando, Pampanga. The faction selected Senator Bong Go as their presidential nominee and incumbent president Rodrigo Duterte as his running mate. They also nominated eight people for senator. The opposing faction led by Pimentel held their convention in Quezon City on September 19, 2021. Senator Manny Pacquiao was nominated as their presidential candidate. On the same day, the Partido Federal ng Pilipinas (PFP) held their own convention, nominating former senator Bongbong Marcos as their presidential candidate. He was also nominated by the Kilusang Bagong Lipunan (KBL) in their convention, which they held on September 24. National democracy coalition Makabayan held their assembly on September 27 and nominated nominees for its party-lists. The Aksyon Demokratiko party also held their convention on September 27 in Manila, selecting Manila mayor Isko Moreno and Willie Ong as their standard bearers for the presidential and vice presidential elections respectively. Aksyon also nominated two persons as their senatorial candidates. PROMDI held their national convention in Cebu City on the same day, nominating Pacquiao as their presidential candidate and approving an electoral alliance between PROMDI and the Pimentel faction of PDP–Laban. On September 28, two labor parties, Labor Party Philippines (LPP) and Partido Lakas ng Manggagawang Pilipino (PLMP), held their political convention in Mabalacat. This convention oversaw the nomination of Marcos as their presidential nominee and the approval of the electoral alliance between LPP and PLMP, endorsement of the AAsenso party-list, and approval of partnerships between LPP and KBL and LPP and PFP. The Partido Lakas ng Masa (PLM) also held their national convention on the same day and nominated labor leader Leody de Guzman as their presidential bet.

Some of the results of the national conventions were noticeably not followed. For the Cusi faction of the PDP–Laban, Bong Go declined to run for president, and Rodrigo Duterte, who originally accepted the nomination, changed his mind and announced his retirement from politics. In the end, Go became the vice presidential nominee, while Ronald dela Rosa was named their presidential nominee. For the Pimentel faction of the same party, Manny Pacquiao was named their standard bearer, but carried the PROMDI party banner in his candidacy, after their faction and PROMDI forged an electoral alliance. Marcos, who was nominated by at least four parties, chose to run under the Partido Federal ng Pilipinas. PLM only nominated De Guzman for president in their convention. Former Akbayan representative Walden Bello was eventually chosen to be his running mate. The Makabayan bloc would also later endorse vice president Leni Robredo and senator Francis Pangilinan as their presidential and vice presidential candidates respectively.

In the flurry of substitutions prior to the deadline, Rodrigo Duterte and Bong Go, erstwhile PDP–Laban politicians, were to run under the Pederalismo ng Dugong Dakilang Samahan as senator and president respectively, to avoid legal complications amidst the ongoing dispute in PDP–Laban. Go himself later on announced his withdrawal from the presidential election.

Coalitions 
The Philippines is a multi-party democracy. This means parties enter into coalitions and alliances with each other prior to, during and after elections in order to be a part of government. These coalitions are ordered by date when it was formalized.

Issues

Relationship with China 

Laura del Rosario, a former Undersecretary for International Economic Affairs, encouraged the public to reject "Manchurian candidates," or candidates who are clandestinely supported by China, who is currently involved in territorial disputes with the Philippines. Del Rosario also said that to ensure that a pro-Chinese leader is elected, China may support more than one candidate in the election.

Candidate substitution 
Substitution of candidates aside from death or illness is allowed in the Philippines, under the Omnibus Election Code. In case of withdrawal, the substitute can replace the original candidate only on the commission's set schedule; for death or disqualification, the substitute can replace the original candidate until midday of election day. Incumbent president Rodrigo Duterte notably was a substitute in 2016 where he won. Deputy speaker Rufus Rodriguez proposed to ban such substitutions, and to reimpose the old rule that automatically makes candidates deemed as resigned on any political position that they are on. The commission promised to be firm on rules regarding substitution after Sara Duterte missed the deadline to file a presidential candidacy.

Smartmatic data breach 
On January 10, 2022, the Manila Bulletin published an article alleging that the COMELEC's servers were hacked by a group, who downloaded more than 60 gigabytes of data containing usernames and passwords for the vote-counting machines (VCMs) and other sensitive information. The commission initially denied its servers were breached and asserted that their system has not yet been connected to any network and that no PINs have been generated yet. Following the report, the National Bureau of Investigation (NBI) launched its own investigation into the incident. Another investigation by the Department of Information and Communications Technology (DICT) asserted that it was not the COMELEC that was hacked, but its software contractor, Smartmatic. A public hearing was held by the Senate. On March 17, 2022, senators Imee Marcos and Tito Sotto, after the Senate's executive session with COMELEC officials, revealed that Smartmatic was breached after an employee allowed a group to copy data from a company-issued laptop. The commission later met with Smartmatic officials on March 31. On April 1, the COMELEC confirmed the Smartmatic breach, but clarified that the leaked data was not related to the elections, and that the SD cards for the VCMs were not compromised.

Election-related violence 
Even before the day of elections, multiple cases of gun violence and attacks were reported in different areas of the country. In Ilocos Sur, a shoot-out led to 2 injuries.

The commission placed the following places under strict and additional control. Once it is placed under COMELEC control, the commission have the direct supervision over officials and employees, and full control over law enforcement agencies guarding the area. Prior to the release of the initial two places, the commission withheld releasing a list of such areas because it has not yet been validated. Most of the places under usurped control of the commission are located in Mindanao.

 Malabang, Lanao del Sur, due to a "recent spate of killings"
 Tubaran, Lanao del Sur, which has a history of election-related violence
 The following places in Bangsamoro, upon recommendation of the police, military, and the regional election director
 Marawi, Lanao del Sur
 Maguing, Lanao del Sur
 Buluan, Maguindanao
 Datu Odin Sinsuat, Maguindanao
 Datu Piang, Maguindanao
 Mangudadatu, Maguindanao
 Pandag, Maguindanao
 Sultan Kudarat, Maguindanao
 Misamis Occidental, for security and safety concerns
 Pilar, Abra, upon petition of its mayor
On the election day itself, several separate incidents of grenade explosions were reported in the Maguindanaon towns of Datu Unsay and Shariff Aguak, which resulted in nine minor injuries. In Buluan town in the same province, a gun attack led to the deaths of three guards. In Datu Piang, six were hurt when a grenade exploded in front of a polling center.

One day after the elections, protests and escalations in the municipal capitol of Butig in Lanao del Sur resulted in multiple injuries and damages to the building's windows. The AFP calmed down the situation after sending additional personnel in the area. Accusations of electoral cheating by bringing VCMs into the capitol as well as allegations of ballot frauds were seen as the primary reason for the conflict between the two camps in the mayoral race.

Issues with vote-counting machines 
Out of the 106,174 vote-counting machines (VCMs) used in the elections, about 1,800 malfunctioned in election day. Commissioner George Garcia listed the common issues that the VCMs encountered as follows:

 940 VCMs had paper jam
 606 VCMs rejected ballots
 158 VCMs had issues with the VCM scanner
 87 VCMs were not printing
 76 VCMs were not printing properly

The affected VCMs were repaired by technicians and only ten faulty machines were replaced.

Voters in several voting precincts complained about the ordeal and many of them exceeded the allotted voting time during election day due to the delays and malfunctions of the machine. Many were told to leave their ballots, with some requiring to sign a waiver, to the precinct director for them to scan it themselves resulting to the dismay of the voters with many rejecting the offer. Some ballots which were successfully entered into the VCMs before were reportedly not counted after the machine broke down requiring a designated technician to repair or replace it. The COMELEC then ordered a temporary time extension for the precincts encountering the problem.

According to national security adviser Hermogenes Esperon Jr., there were more than 20,000 attempts to hack the VCMs' system and attempts of automated fraud but all were refuted. Esperon Jr. also noted that of the numbers of malfunctioned VCMs, it did not reach one percent of the total number of VCMs that were used during the elections hence signifying that the system is effective nonetheless.

Observations 
The International Coalition for Human Rights in the Philippines (ICHRP), a global human rights group, in its final report released online in June, said the May 2022 elections failed to meet the standards of "free, honest, and fair" voting citing reports of incidents of human rights violations and fraud. ICHRP recommended the restructuring of the COMELEC and replacing vote-counting machines for future elections.

Campaign 
Campaigning for nationally elected positions began on February 8. The commission, due to the ongoing COVID-19 pandemic, prohibited entering houses, kissing and hugging voters, and taking selfies with voters. Campaigns should also get an approval from the local elections office before they are allowed to actually campaign. The commission also set up a Facebook page for its e-rallies, allowing candidates and parties a limited time to campaign. With most of the country being placed in Alert Level 1, the commission recalibrated its rules on March 16, increasing the capacity for venues and removing the need for permits for localities in levels 1 and 2.

The commission, as mandated by the Fair Elections Act, also banned campaign paraphernalia outside the common poster areas in every locality, in public spaces, and in private property without the owner's consent.

Oplan Baklas 
The Philippine National Police started its "Oplan Baklas" on the first day of campaigning. The Leni Robredo presidential campaign, citing the arbitrary application of the law, were considering legal action on the actions of the authorities, as they removed campaign materials on private properties. This followed the removal of their campaign materials from their media center in Quezon City, and from their Santiago, Isabela campaign headquarters. Interior Secretary Eduardo Año defended their actions, saying that private property owners were first notified of the violations before the campaign materials were removed. 1Sambayan cited Diocese of Bacolod v. COMELEC Supreme Court case, where "COMELEC (has) no legal basis to regulate expressions made by private citizens." On March 8, the Supreme Court issued a restraining order against the operation.

Immediately one day after the elections, the MMDA and several LGUs conducted a widespread enforcement of removing campaign posters and electoral paraphernalia. Schools and government establishments with nearby posters were prioritized for clearance for the incoming face-to-face classes.

Candidates

Isko-Willie

L

MP3 Alliance

Tuloy ang Pagbabago

Lacson-Sotto

Team Robredo-Pangilinan

Uniteam Marcos-Duterte

Others

Non-Independents

Independents

Results 
The Commission on Elections published that there would be 18,180 posts up for election, including the 80 seats that would have been disputed in the Bangsamoro Parliament. The commission then announced that there will be 18,100 posts up, with a total of 47,853 candidates running across all posts.

Voting for overseas absentee voting began on April 10 and ended on May 9, election day in the Philippines. About 1.6 million were registered voters outside the country.

The commission will declare the winners for all positions, except for president and vice president, where Congress will declare the results.

For president 

The presidential election will determine the successor of Rodrigo Duterte. Duterte is term-limited and thus cannot run for president. The Commission on Elections released the official list of candidates on January 18, 2022, with 10 candidates listed on the final ballot.

Bongbong Marcos was elected with over 31 million votes.

For vice president 

The vice presidential election will determine the successor of Leni Robredo. Robredo is eligible to run for a second term but decided to run for president. The Commission on Elections released the official list of candidates on January 18, 2022. There were nine candidates on the ballot.

Sara Duterte, daughter of outgoing president Rodrigo Duterte, was elected with over 32 million votes.

Congress 
Members of the 19th Congress of the Philippines will be elected in this election.

Senate 

One half of the membership or 12 of 24 seats in the Senate, or those last contested in 2016, are up for election. Those elected in 2019 will be joined by the winners of this election to serve in the 19th Congress. There are 178 people who filed up to run for a Senate seat. The 64 names were included in the ballot.

Among the senators-elect, four were reelected, five are returning to the Senate, and three, including top-notcher Robin Padilla are neophytes. Juan Miguel Zubiri was elected Senate President.

House of Representatives 

All 316 seats in the House of Representatives will be up for election, an increase of 12 seats from the outgoing 18th Congress. There are now 253 congressional districts, each electing one representative, and 63 seats elected via the party-list system on a nationwide vote. There were 733 people who filed to run for Congress.

After the election, allies of president-elect Bongbong Marcos are seen to be the supermajority in the House of Representatives. Martin Romauldez, a cousin of Marcos, was subsequently elected Speaker.

Elections at congressional districts

Party-list election

Local 

Local elections above the barangay level are expected to be held along with the national elections:

All 81 governors and vice governors, and 782 seats to provincial boards in all provinces;
All 146 city mayors and vice mayors, and 1,650 seats to city councils in all cities
All 1,488 municipal mayors and vice mayors, and 11,908 seats to municipal councils in all municipalities

In popular culture 

 "2 joints", hand gesture in support for Isko Moreno
 "Ang Presidente, Bise Presidente", chant in support for Leni Robredo turned into a song by Gabriel Valenciano
 "Bagong Pagsilang", Marcos anthem published in 1973, re-released in 2022 with a new version for the Bongbong Marcos campaign
 "Bagong Pilipinas, Bagong Mukha", campaign jingle composed by Andrew E. for Bongbong Marcos and Sara Duterte
 "Kay Leni Tayo", Leni Robredo's campaign jingle
 Yorme: The Isko Domagoso Story, biographical film about Isko Moreno released in January 2022

References

External links 

 Vote SAFE Pilipinas, official website of the Commission on Elections for the 2022 Philippine general election
 https://2022electionresults.comelec.gov.ph/, official website of the Commission on Elections for the results of the 2022 Philippine general election

 
General
2022
General election